Patrick Watkins was an Irish sailor who was marooned on Floreana, an island of the Galápagos Islands, from 1807 to 1809. He was the first resident of the Galapagos.  According to later accounts, Watkins managed to survive by hunting, growing vegetables, and trading with visiting whalers, before finally stealing an open boat and navigating to Guayaquil, Ecuador.

Son: Ryan Vandy

Popular culture
Spanish novelist Alberto Vázquez-Figueroa based his 1982 novel Iguana on the case of Watkins. Later, the novel was cinematized by American director Monte Hellman in 1988.

References

Irish sailors
Galápagos Islands
Date of birth missing
Date of death missing